Pterophorus rhyparias is a moth of the family Pterophoridae.

Distribution
It is known from the Democratic Republic of Congo, Ethiopia, Kenya, Madagascar, Namibia, South Africa, Tanzania, Yemen, Uganda, Malawi and Zimbabwe.

The species is characterized by the pale ochreous-white colour with some small black dots along the costa and dorsum of both forewing lobes. The colour of the species ranges from grey-white to pale ochreous-white. The number of dots on the forewing may be reduced.

References

rhyparias
Moths of Africa
Moths of Madagascar
Moths of the Middle East
Moths described in 1908